is a former Japanese football player.

Club statistics

References

External links

1983 births
Living people
Association football people from Saitama Prefecture
Japanese footballers
Japanese expatriate footballers
Expatriate footballers in Germany
J1 League players
J2 League players
Shonan Bellmare players
Gainare Tottori players
Japanese expatriate sportspeople in Germany
People from Ageo, Saitama
Association football defenders